Scrobipalpa remanella is a moth in the family Gelechiidae. It was described by Povolný in 1966. It is found in Iraq.

The forewings are nearly uniform clay brownish with some scattered black-tipped scales. The hindwings are dull transparent with dark margins.

References

Scrobipalpa
Moths described in 1966